Mulkrajanops is a genus of brontothere endemic to India during the Eocene living from 55.8 to 48.6 mya, existing for approximately .

Taxonomy
Mulkrajanops was named by Kumar and Sahni (1985). It was assigned to Eotitanopinae by Kumar and Sahni (1985); and to Brontotheriidae by Thewissen et al. (2001).

References

Brontotheres
Eocene odd-toed ungulates
Eocene mammals of Asia
Fossil taxa described in 1985
Brontotheres of Asia